Tori Amos: Live from New York is a benefit concert performed by American singer and songwriter Tori Amos on January 23, 1997. The concert was performed at the Madison Square Garden Theater in New York to launch "Unlock the Silence", a year-long promotional and fund-raising campaign sponsored by Calvin Klein to raise awareness of the work undertaken by RAINN, the Rape, Abuse and Incest National Network, a non-profit organization offering support and counseling to survivors of sexual assault. The performance included compositions from Amos' first three albums, including "Silent All These Years" from her debut album Little Earthquakes (1992), which served as the touchstone track for the "Unlock the Silence" campaign.

During the performance of "Muhammad My Friend", Amos was joined on stage by her friend Maynard James Keenan from the band Tool.

The concert was recorded and released on VHS in 1998.

Set Listing

 Beauty Queen/Horses
 Leather
 Blood Roses
 Little Amsterdam
 Cornflake Girl
 The Waitress
 Little Earthquakes
 Upside Down
 Winter
 Precious Things
 Caught a Lite Sneeze
 Talula (The Tornado Mix)
 Me and a Gun
 Marianne
 Silent All These Years
 Muhammad My Friend  (with Maynard James Keenan from Tool)
 Pretty Good Year

Tori Amos video albums
1998 video albums
Live video albums
1998 live albums
Albums recorded at Madison Square Garden
Warner Music Vision video albums
Warner Music Vision live albums